The 1965 Texas Western Miners football team was an American football team that represented Texas Western College (now known as the University of Texas at El Paso) as an independent during the 1965 NCAA University Division football season. In its first season under head coach Bobby Dobbs, the team compiled an 8–3 record, defeated TCU in the 1965 Sun Bowl, and outscored all opponents by a total of 317 to 206.

Schedule

References

Texas Western
UTEP Miners football seasons
Sun Bowl champion seasons
Texas Western Miners football